Timothy Lyle Wood is an American former figure skater. He is a two-time World champion, a 1968 Olympic silver medalist and a three-time U.S. national champion.

Personal life
Born on June 21, 1948, in Highland Park, Michigan, Timothy Lyle Wood is the youngest of four sons of Kenneth Wood, a surgeon known for his work with lung cancer patients. In 1968, he was a pre-law student at John Carroll University. He later attended a graduate school in accounting.

Skating career
Wood was taught by the English coach Ronnie Baker at the Detroit Skating Club from the age of seven. He became the U.S. national novice champion in the 1961–62 season. On the junior level, he was awarded the bronze medal at the 1963 U.S. Championships and won the title in 1964.

The following season, Wood advanced to the senior level and took bronze at the 1965 U.S. Championships in Lake Placid, New York. Assigned to his first major international events, he placed 5th at the North American Championships and 13th at the World Championships in Colorado Springs, Colorado.

Fourth at the 1966 U.S. Championships, he returned to the top three the following year. He finished 9th at the 1967 World Championships in Vienna, Austria.

At the 1968 U.S. Championships in Philadelphia, Wood defeated Gary Visconti and John Misha Petkevich to win the first of his three U.S. national titles. The trio were selected to represent the U.S. at the 1968 Winter Olympics in Grenoble, France. Still coached by Baker, Wood won the Olympic silver medal after placing second in the compulsory figures and third in the free skate. He stood on the podium with Austria's Wolfgang Schwarz (gold) and France's Patrick Péra (bronze). Wood attributed his success to becoming mature enough to conquer his competition nerves, and to training harder. While also a university student, he spent 7 and a half hours a day training, including at least four hours just on compulsory figures. Competing in Geneva, Switzerland at the 1968 World Championships, he finished second to the defending World champion Emmerich Danzer of Austria, who had been fourth at the Olympics.

In 1969, Wood successfully defended his national title against Petkevich and won the 1969 North American Championships ahead of Canada's Jay Humphry. He then won his first World title, finishing ahead of Czechoslovakia's Ondrej Nepela and France's Patrick Péra at the event in Colorado Springs, Colorado.

Prevailing against Petkevich, Wood became national champion for the third consecutive year at the 1970 U.S. Championships in Tulsa, Oklahoma. He then overcame a challenge from Nepela to win the 1970 World Championships in Ljubljana, Yugoslavia.

During Wood's professional skating career, he performed with the Ice Capades, Ice Follies and Holiday on Ice.

Later life
Wood formed a limited liability company, TLW, in 1996, and has expressed interest in opening a sports complex in California. In May 2015, it was reported that several investors had filed lawsuits against him.

Results

References

Further reading

 Benjamin T. Wright, Skating in America

1948 births
American male single skaters
John Carroll University alumni
Figure skaters at the 1968 Winter Olympics
Olympic silver medalists for the United States in figure skating
Living people
Olympic medalists in figure skating
World Figure Skating Championships medalists
Medalists at the 1968 Winter Olympics